The Subaru WRX is an all-wheel drive sport compact car manufactured by the Japanese automaker Subaru, originally based on the Impreza created for the World Rally Championship in 1992. Subaru claimed the name WRX stands for "World Rally eXperimental". Since 2014, the WRX lineup has been split from the Impreza, with a different body style that is not offered as an optional hatchback/wagon, being introduced as the separate Levorg model.

Impreza-based models (1992–2014) 

The first three generations of the WRX, sold until the 2015 model year, were based on standard Impreza platforms.

The initial first-generation WRX models were based on the Impreza sedan (GC chassis code). They were followed by wagons (GF) in 1993 and the first upgraded WRX STi version, introduced in 1994. Several limited edition first-generation coupés were offered in the late 1990s and early 2000s which were never sold in the US and are highly sought after by Subaru enthusiasts. 

The second-generation WRX (GD/GG chassis codes for the sedan/wagon, respectively) was brought over to the United States domestic market for model year 2002, with the STI being brought over for model year 2004. The initial "bugeye" front end styling (2000) was superseded by the "blobeye" in 2004 and the "hawkeye" in 2006. Under an agreement between Fuji Heavy Industries and General Motors, Saab sold its own version of the WRX, marketed as the Saab 9-2X, for the 2005 and 2006 model years. The 9-2X was available in both a standard and performance package, with the latter badged as the 9-2X Aero; the Aero was nearly identical to the second-generation WRX wagon, mechanically.

The third-generation WRX were sold as chassis codes GE (sedan) and GH (hatchback, replacing the earlier wagon version) initially; the third-generation WRX STI was sold with a widened chassis and was available only as a widebody hatch (GR). For the 2011 model year, the third-generation WRX sedan and hatch were moved to the GV and GR wide-body chassis variants, respectively, and a widebody sedan version of the STI (GV) was marketed. The Impreza was redesigned and the fourth-generation was first marketed for model year 2012, making it a distinct model from the WRX, which continued on the third-generation GV/GR chassis until 2014 in most markets.

The fourth-generation WRX were given the VA chassis designation and marketed as a separate model from the Impreza starting in 2015.

First generation (VA; 2014) 

For the VA series WRX released in 2014 for the 2015 model year, Subaru decided to move away from marketing the WRX and WRX STI under the Impreza name. This time, the Impreza name was dropped in all markets in which the new model is named simply as the WRX, as had been the case in North America with the previous model, while in Japan it was sold as the WRX S4.

The WRX and WRX STI are the performance model based on the GJ/GP Impreza with higher output engines, firmer suspension, larger brakes, slightly resculpted body panels, lowered ride height and larger intakes. The body design also took a stronger departure from the Impreza donor model than in the past. The general WRX profile/silhouette was carried over from the Impreza, as were the front doors, trunk lid, and interior. However, the entire front end bodywork plus the rear quarter panels were unique to the WRX. The rear doors received a subtle reskin with an upwards kink and revised character line, but retained an otherwise identical shape.

Subaru had promised to completely move the WRX and STI off the Impreza chassis and body to create a standalone model,. The VA-body WRX is based on a modified Impreza body and chassis, with the Impreza name dropped from the WRX in all markets. For this generation, Subaru decided to not produce a WRX or WRX STI hatchback as had been previously offered. The previous generation hatchback made up approximately 50 percent of US WRX and WRX STI sales.

Facelift

Powertrain 

This model is the first of the WRX line to deviate from the EJ-series engine. It uses the new 2.0-liter FA20F engine, which has direct injection and a twin-scroll turbocharger. On all previous WRXs, the turbocharger was located near the right-hand side of the firewall, close to the third cylinder. With the new FA20F engine, Subaru fitted the turbocharger at the front of the car, close to the serpentine accessory belts. There is a robust aluminum skid plate that protects the underside of the turbocharger. The FA20's high compression ratio of 10.6:1 combined with its 68° intake and 54° exhaust cam phasing range allow it to produce excellent off-boost efficiency as well as a wide torque peak. A 6-speed TY75 manual transmission is standard on the WRX, up from 5-speeds. It is also available with a Lineartronic TR690 CVT with 6 or 8 simulated "gears" accessible through paddle shifters on the steering wheel. The Japanese-spec WRX S4 is only available with the CVT.

Behind the wheel, the most noticeable difference between the EJ and FA engines is the latter's broader torque curve.

The WRX STI retains the EJ engine from the previous generation STI (2.0-litre EJ207 for Japanese models, 2.5-litre EJ257 for international models), with dual AVCS. However, it is equipped with modifications to the ECU which have increased fuel economy, and has given a slight boost in power. The WRX STI also retains the 6-speed TY85 manual transmission (the CVT is not available on the STI) from the previous generation.

There are also reports that along with the ECU changes, the rev limit was raised to 7,100 rpm to support the power increase at the upper rev range to support a stronger top end. It also retains the hydraulic power steering system as opposed to using the standard WRX's new electric-assisted rack. The steering rack was changed to a quicker 13:1 ratio, as used in the Japan delivered vehicles, as opposed to the 15:1 ratio of the previous models.

A sound tube device, also seen on the BRZ, has also been fitted to the air intake system to channel certain induction and turbo frequencies into the cabin, reports show this is only fitted to vehicles in some markets. In Europe, Australia, Canada and Japan, the STI is available with and without the wing. Starting in 2016, the US version of the limited STI was also made available with either the traditional high wing or, optionally, with the standard WRX low profile wing.

The third digit of the model code on a VA-era WRX designates the type of powertrain used. The possible digits are:
 G: WRX with the FA20F engine
 B: WRX STI with the EJ207 engine
 F: WRX STI with the EJ257 engine

Updates 

In January 2017 for the North America market, Subaru announced several improvements that addressed some of the criticism of the 2015 model debut, including a newly revised suspension, revised, upgraded interior materials and a quieter cabin, and a revised front styling. For the WRX, a newly available performance Package option included Recaro front seats with 8-way power driver's seat, improved brake pads, and a moonroof delete to reduce weight. Also new was upgraded EyeSight Driver Assist Technology safety features.

For the 2018 model year, the WRX received some mid-generation improvements. The 2018 model first went on sale at dealerships in summer 2017. The 2018 WRX and WRX STI mid-model improvement continued with the 6-speed manual transmission came as standard equipment, and the optional Lineartronic CVT automatic transmission with Intelligent, Sport 6-speed paddle shift emulation and Sport# (pronounced "Sport Sharp") 8-speed paddle shift emulation. The standard WRX added heated exterior mirrors (already a standard on higher level trims). A new, larger 5.9-inch high-definition multi-function display replaced the older 4.3-inch unit allowing the driver to see vehicle functions more easily. The WRX Premium trim added a larger multimedia audio unit. WRX Limited models added an 8-way power driver's seat with lumbar adjustment.

In May 2018, the 2019 model year WRX and WRX STI was announced. The 2019 model first went on sale at dealerships in the summer of 2018.

The 2019 model introduced a new Subaru STARLINK infotainment system integrated standard with Apple CarPlay and Android Auto, as well as an optional Harman Kardon entertainment system and an optional larger infotainment screen size from 6.2 inches to 7.0 inches.

The 2019 WRX equipped with the optional Lineartronic CVT also came standard with the Subaru EyeSight driver assist technology. On previous models, Eyesight was only available as an option package. Also optional on the CVT equipped WRX was Reverse Automatic Braking, a feature unlikely to be implemented in non-CVT equipped vehicles.

Subaru's collision avoidance system, known as EyeSight, is only available on CVT models, along with reverse automatic braking. EyeSight was made standard on all CVT-equipped models starting with model year 2020. European sales of the WRX STI were ended in 2018.

Special editions

WRX STI Launch Edition 
In 2015, Subaru released the WRX STI Launch Edition that came in World Rally Blue Pearl exterior paint combined with gold-painted, 18-inch, BBS alloy wheels. Only 1000 units of these were released in North America.

WRX STI S207 
In the same year, Subaru also released the WRX STI S207, limited to 400 units sold only for the Japanese market. Upgrades also include a quicker-ratio 11-to-1 steering rack (compared to 13-to-1 for the stock unit). STI-spec Recaro front bucket seats, Bilstein adjustable DampMatic II front suspension, and drilled rotors clamped by Brembo monoblock six-piston front calipers and four-pot rear calipers. Up to 200 of the units could be equipped with the NBR Challenge Package, which features a carbon-fibre wing and a badge commemorating Subaru's class victory at the 2015 Nürburgring 24 Hours.

WRX STI Hyper Blue 
In 2016, Subaru released the WRX STI Hyper Blue special edition series, with production limited to 700 units for the United States. The new color covers the outside, and it is also offset with gloss black 18-inch BBS wheels, badges and mirror caps. Blue stitching brings the color into the interior, and Subaru's seven-inch navigation system with a nine-speaker stereo is standard for this version. In Australia, Subaru announced the WRX Premium Hyper Blue special edition with the CVT automatic will be limited to 200 units targeted to customers, and WRX STI Premium with the six-speed gearbox will be limited to just 50 units. Canada was given 200 units named "Hikari" <Japanese for the word shine, with turnkey start, basic stereo non-GPS head unit and moon roof.

WRX STI S208 

In 2017, Subaru released the WRX STI S208, limited to 450 units sold only for the Japanese market. It has other upgrades similar to those of the WRX STI S207- a quicker 11:1 ratio steering rack, Bilstein DampMatic II front suspension, Recaro front bucket seats, 19-inch BBS wheels, drilled rotors clamped by Brembo monoblock six-piston front calipers and four-pot rear calipers, intercooler water spray, a torque vectoring system, and more. Up to 350 units could be equipped with the NBR Challenge Package, which features a carbon fibre wing, front lip spoiler, and roof. The S208 was offered in 3 colors- WR Blue Pearl, Crystal White Pearl, and Cool Grey Khaki (only available with the NBR Challenge Package). Standard models cost ¥6,264,000 with tax and NBR Challenge Package-equipped models cost ¥6,890,400 ($63,229) with the carbon fibre lip spoiler or ¥7,106,400 with the carbon fibre rear wing.

WRX STI Diamond Edition 
As a way of celebrating 30 years of the STI nameplate (in 2018), Subaru offered a limited edition WRX STI Diamond Edition which was developed by Subaru Southern Africa's technical team making it exclusively available to the region with only 30 being produced. The remapping of the Electronic Control Unit and the fitment of a performance exhaust system has contributed to improved performance. A new engine brace has been fitted for better stability and balance. The WRX STI Diamond Edition rides 20mm lower than the standard WRX STI and the body kit, in a High Viz yellow further lowers the front-end by 10 mm. The spoiler vane gets a stainless steel STI badge unique to this limited edition model and high gloss black Diamond Edition badges appear on the sides of the rear wing. The WRX STI Diamond Edition rides on 19-inch lightweight and darkened aluminum Y-design alloy wheels.

WRX STI Type RA 
For the 2018 model year, Subaru of America introduced the WRX STI Type RA to celebrate the successful record attempt at becoming the fastest sedan around the Nürburgring. This numbered limited edition was restricted to 500 examples for the United States and 75 examples for Canada. The WRX STI Type RA featured 19" gold-colored forged wheels, carbon roof and spoiler, among other changes. The car also featured a carbon fiber roof and rear wing. It was available in a choice of three colors: World Rally Blue Pearl, Black and White.

WRX STI RA-R 
For the model year 2018, but available only in Japan, Subaru debuted its lightest, fastest and best-handling WRX to date. RA-R stands for "Record Attempt-Racing," a nod to previous, track-based STI variants. Meanwhile, Subaru Tecnica International helped the vehicle shave some 22 pounds by bringing the weight down to 3263 pounds while reinforcing the chassis and putting on bigger brakes while adding some aerodynamic elements. A new muffler gives the car an improved gas flow by approximately 60% and a throatier exhaust note.

WRX Raiu Edition 
In 2018, Subaru launched the 2019 WRX Raiu edition, the first special edition Subaru to be sold in Canada for over 15 years. This model is similar to the Series. Gray edition sold in the US, with its name derived from the Japanese word for thunderstorm. This model was not available with a CVT, buyers could only get a 6-speed manual transmission. The Raiu Edition got sporty upgrades, like an STI-branded front lip, side sill, and rear side spoilers along with a unique short-throw shifter. Black interior and exterior accents were added, with gunmetal finish 18" alloy wheels and Cool Grey Khaki paint also being the only wheel/color options. Jurid front brakes and red-painted calipers were also standard. The Raiu Edition also got the Sport-tech RS trim's existing features, including Recaro front seats with "Ultrasuede," a seven-inch touchscreen "Starlink" multimedia system, and a nine-speaker Harmon Kardon stereo system. Only 100 units of the Raiu Edition were made available, with a price point of $40,995 CAD.

WRX Series.Gray 
For model year 2019, a WRX Series.Gray was made available in the United States with production limited to 750 units. The exterior color was Cool Gray Khaki, featuring exclusive black finish WRX 18-inch alloy wheels, Crystal Black Silica badging and foldable exterior mirrors. Other performance upgrades included Jurid high performance front brake pads and a moonroof delete to save weight. The interior front seats were upgraded to ultrasuede covered Recaro seats with an 8-way power feature for the driver. An STI version was also sold with 250 made. Both models also got upgraded suspension and brakes.

WRX STI TC380 
Subaru announced yet another limited-run model of the WRX STI trim. Modifications to each car are overseen by Japanese rally driver Toshihiro Arai, who competed in the World Rally Championship with Subaru. The improvements include a suite of HKS parts, including a GT III RS Sport turbo kit, Sport Turbo resonator and a high-flow catalytic converter. Arai Motorsports will install the HKS parts while adding components of its own, including an RQA air filter and an in-house front chassis brace to help with frame rigidity. A carbon fiber rear lip spoiler aids grip at insanely high speeds and serial-numbered Recaro bucket seats explicitly designed for the TC380 will hold the driver down inside. Overall the automaker plans to manufacture only 50 of the WRX STI TC380. The car will continue production until all 50 units are exhausted, joining a series of other limited edition WRX variants such as the Japanese RA-R, United States Seres.Gray and Canadian Raiu Editions.

WRX STI S209 
For the model year 2019, a special edition WRX STI S209 was made available, being the first S series STI sold in the USA, and the third S series based on the VA series platform, following the S207 and S208. Canards are added to the front, and the STI Type RA's carbon roof and wing are retained. The suspension is improved and derived from other S series cars, along with Subaru's Nürburgring race car. The car is available in WR Blue with grey wheels and Crystal White with gold wheels. The S209 is also transported from the Gunma, Japan plant to Subaru's Kiryu-Kougo subsidiary to be finished since the S209 does not meet the standards for cars manufactured in Gunma. The car is sold under the STI brand rather than the Subaru brand, which has caused difficulties importing the car into the US.

WRX Series.White 
For model year 2020, a WRX Series.White was made available, with 500 units built, along with 500 STI models being made. Suspension and braking upgrades were included, along with cosmetic ones like bronze wheels and black accents. The car is only available in a special ceramic white.

WRX STI Kanrai Edition 
Again for the 2020 model year but only available to the Canadian market is the arrival of the winter warrior WRX STI Kanrai Edition. Only 75 units were available to the Canadian market compared to the Raiu Edition's 100 units. The WRX STI Kanrai Edition was built on the WRX STI Sport-Tech foundation. Kanrai, which translates to "winter thunder," sports an exclusive Ceramic White exterior paint along with the aggressive characteristics found in the WRX STI. Outfitted on this WRX STI is STI-tuned Bilstein performance suspension, lightweight 19" BBS forged alloy bronze-painted wheels paired with Michelin Pilot Sport Cup 2 tires, which deliver significant handling dynamics and grip. The standard Brembo 6-pot front and 2-pot rear brake system with cross-drilled rotors and silver painted calipers. Subaru removed the spare tire and replaced it with a repair kit to help this STI shave some pounds. The Kanrai incorporates a black low-profile lip spoiler, black badging, mirror caps, and shark fin antenna to complement the Ceramic White paint. What makes it pop is the black front grille receives the STI's unique cherry colour.

WRX STI EJ20 Final Edition 

A limited EJ20 Final Edition was made available in Japan in late 2019 to commemorate the end of production of the EJ20 engine. With only 555 units produced, the limited edition has a balanced version of the EJ20 engine, according to Subaru the pistons and connecting rods have a 50 percent reduction in weight differences, crankshafts have an 85 percent lower tolerance in rotational balance, flywheels and clutch covers have a 50 percent reduction in rotational balance tolerances, precision close to that of a racing engine.

Receptions 
The 2015 WRX was met with mixed reviews by automotive journalists. It placed second to the 2015 Volkswagen GTI in separate comparison tests in the September 2014 issues of Car and Driver and Motor Trend. In general, it bested its sub-$30,000 competition in nearly every performance metric, but suffered from a cheaper interior and a less comfortable ride. Its styling is usually listed as polarizing, too, although the bulk of criticism in that area was based on the lack of a hatchback model.

Performance numbers vary from publication to publication. Testing from Car and Driver, Road & Track and Motor Trend produced 0–60 mph (97 km/h) times as fast as 4.8 seconds and as slow as 5.5 seconds. (CVT-equipped WRXs are about a half-second slower to 60 mph and through the quarter-mile.) On the skidpad, roadholding numbers range from 0.92 G to 0.96 G. Braking from  results in stops as short as 156–166 feet.

Issues 
WRX models from the 2015 through the 2019 model year suffer from rev hang, though rev hang was reduced for the 2020 model year. WRX STI models still suffer from past issues with the EJ257 engine, like piston ring and rod bearing failure under certain conditions.

Second generation (VB; 2021) 

The second-generation WRX was previewed by a series of concept cars branded as VIZIV Performance Concept as early as 2017. The production WRX was redesigned for the 2022 model year and moved to the Subaru Global Platform. Subaru was set to debut the all-new 2022 WRX on August 19, 2021, at the 2021 New York International Auto Show. However, due to the auto show being canceled, the unveiling was rescheduled for September 10.

In March 2022, Subaru announced they would not market the expected second-generation WRX STI high-performance model with an internal-combustion engine. Dominick Infante of Subaru stated "[A new WRX STI] would have a very limited shelf life ... The [emissions] regulations are changing so quickly that it kind of wouldn't make any sense." The WRX generation after VB may include a WRX STI, but that future WRX STI is likely to include a hybrid or battery-electric drivetrain.

North America 
On September 10, 2021, the new second-generation standalone Subaru WRX (fifth generation for the WRX nameplate) was revealed for the North American market. Engine updates include a larger cylinder bore, an electronically controlled wastegate, and air bypass valves. Transmission choices are either a new CVT called the Subaru Performance Transmission (SPT) or a six-speed manual; the SPT offers an all-wheel-drive system with variable torque distribution, while the manual transmission is equipped with a center differential and viscous coupling. When equipped with the "Drive Mode Select System", the car is equipped with electronically controlled adaptive dampers, which is a first for the WRX.

Japan

The second-generation WRX S4 for the Japanese market made its debut on November 25, 2021.

Initially, it was available in two models: GT-H and STI Sport R. Within those models, an optional "EX" grade is available for an additional  that adds the Subaru "EyeSight X" advanced driver-assistance system. The instrument panel of the "EX" grades use a  LCD display, while the conventional grades use two analog instruments with a small  central display. A  LCD display for navigation is optional for the non-EX grades, while EX grades receive a portrait orientation  LCD display in the center console for additional controls and displays. Compared to the GT-H, the STI Sport R model upgrades include electronically controlled dampers.

In January 2022, Subaru and STI jointly exhibited several concept models, including the WRX S4 STI Performance, which mainly includes cosmetic upgrades, and the world premiere of the STI E-RA Concept, billed as a carbon-neutral car.

Station wagon

On October 14, 2021, the second-generation Levorg was introduced in Australia and New Zealand as the WRX Sportswagon and the WRX GT respectively. It is powered by the same 2.4-liter turbo boxer engine from the WRX sedan.

The WRX wagon was released in the Philippines in June 2022, in Thailand in August 2022 and in Singapore in January 2023

Viziv concepts 

The automotive press speculated the Viziv Performance concept shown at the Tokyo Motor Show in October 2017 would set the styling direction for the forthcoming second-generation WRX. Powertrain details were not released, only stating that it uses Subaru's Symmetrical AWD with a boxer engine. 

An updated Viziv Performance STI Concept was shown at the Tokyo Auto Salon in January 2018, leading to further speculation those styling modifications could show up in a future WRX STI. The UK marketing director of Subaru, Chris Hawken, stated in November 2017 that the "Subaru Global Platform has been designed to take hybrid and electric" and "that is the way STI is going", leading to speculation the next WRX STI may use a hybrid drivetrain. The two Performance Concepts were followed by a similarly-styled hatchback, the Viziv Tourer Concept, in March 2018.

Sales
In the United States, sales have fallen since 2015, with 2015 being the peak year for the WRX even after including pre-split models.

Motorsport

Rallying 

In 1993, an Impreza Group A rally car was taken to Rally Finland after the Subaru Legacy rally car had its last outing at Rally New Zealand. The car was crashed in the race and was never used again for rally, but its good performance was noted, as it made 2nd place and was even leading the rally at one point. The Impreza was smaller and more nimble, giving it an advantage over the Legacy. In 1994, the WRX STI became available and entered use for WRC. Since then, Subaru has stopped competing in WRC, citing the Great Recession as a cause, though they still are active in rally events around the United States using the WRX STI as a basis for their competing cars.

In 2016, former British rally champion Mark Higgins lapped the Isle of Man TT course with the VA WRX STI in 17 minutes, 35.139 seconds.

Endurance 

Subaru Tecnica International have campaigned the WRX STI in the Nürburgring 24 Hours since 2008, winning the SP3T class six times (2011, 2012, 2015, 2016, 2018, and 2019). STI did not enter the 2020 or 2021 contests due to the COVID-19 pandemic.

Touring car racing 
Several touring cars based on the WRX STI have entered TCR International Series since 2016, and subsequently World Touring Car Cup.

References

External links 

 Official website (United States)

Cars introduced in 2014
2020s cars
WRX
All-wheel-drive vehicles
Cars powered by boxer engines
Sport compact cars
Sports sedans